In cryptography, N-hash is a cryptographic hash function based on the FEAL round function, and is now considered insecure. It was proposed in 1990 in an article by Miyaguchi, Ohta, and Iwata; weaknesses were published the following year.

N-hash has a 128-bit hash size. A message is divided into 128-bit blocks, and each block is combined with the hash value computed so far using the g compression function. g contains eight rounds, each of which uses an F function, similar to the one used by FEAL.

Eli Biham and Adi Shamir (1991) applied the technique of differential cryptanalysis to N-hash, and showed that collisions could be generated faster than by a birthday attack for N-hash variants with even up to 12 rounds.

References

Cryptographic hash functions